Miroslav Vlach (October 19, 1935 in Český Těšín, Czechoslovakia – December 8, 2001 in Ostrava, Czech Republic) was an ice hockey player who played for the Czechoslovak national team. He won a bronze medal at the 1964 Winter Olympics.

References

External links

1935 births
2001 deaths
Czechoslovak ice hockey forwards
Ice hockey players at the 1960 Winter Olympics
Ice hockey players at the 1964 Winter Olympics
Medalists at the 1964 Winter Olympics
Olympic bronze medalists for Czechoslovakia
Olympic ice hockey players of Czechoslovakia
Olympic medalists in ice hockey
People from Český Těšín
Sportspeople from the Moravian-Silesian Region
Czech ice hockey forwards
Czech ice hockey coaches
Czechoslovak ice hockey coaches
Czechoslovak expatriate sportspeople in Austria
Czechoslovak expatriate ice hockey people
Expatriate ice hockey players in Austria